The Federation of Arab News Agencies (FANA), a branch of the Arab League, is a membership organization for Arabic-language, national news agencies, currently of 18 or 19 members and established in 1975 in Beirut, Lebanon.

Mission
FANA's mission is to promote cooperation among its members and around the world.

FANA reflects development of similar regional groups including the Alliance of Mediterranean News Agencies (AMAN), the European Alliance of News Agencies (EANA), the and the Organization of Asia-Pacific News Agencies (OANA).

History

Efforts to form a union of Arab national news agencies started on October 28, 1964, in Cairo, Egypt, and resulted in a conference in Amman, Jordan, in 1965.  In January 1974, the League of Arab States ("Arab League") called for a second conference, held in Baghdad, Iraq, in April 1974.  During a third conference in Beirut in 1975, the Federation of Arab News Agencies formed and made Beirut its headquarters, whose founding members came from Jordan, Tunisia, Algeria, Saudi Arabia, Syria, Iraq, Palestine, Lebanon, Libya, Morocco, and Yemen.

Organization
FANA holds an annual General Assembly every November, while general managers of its national news agency members meet semi-annually.

Members

FANA's official English website has varying current members listed, which include:
 Algeria - Algeria Press Service (APS)
 Bahrain - Bahrain News Agency (BNA)
 Egypt - Middle East News Agency (MENA)
 Iraq - National Iraqi News Agency (NINA)
 Jordan - Jordan News Agency (PETRA)
 Kuwait - Kuwait News Agency (KUNA)
 Lebanon - National News Agency (NNA)
 Libya - Libyan News Agency (LANA) (AKA Jamahiriya News Agency)
 Mauritania - Mauritanian News Agency (AMI)
 Morocco - Maghreb Arabe Press (MAP)
 Oman - Oman News Agency (ONA)
 Palestine - Palestine News Agency (WAFA)
 Qatar - Qatar News Agency (QNA)
 Saudi Arabia - Saudi Press Agency (SPA)
 Syria - Syrian Arab News Agency (SANA)
 Sudan - Sudan News Agency (SUNA)
 Tunisia - Tunis Afrique Presse (TAP)
 UAE - Emirates News Agency (WAM)
 Yemen - Saba News Agency (SABA)

Leadership
FANA's current head is Abdullah bin Fahd bin Mohammed Al-Hussein.

FANA's leadership has included:
 Ziyad Abdel Fattah (1978-????)
 Nasr Taha Mustafa (2003-2005)

Awards
 2006:  Best Photo to Layal Najib (1983-2006)

See also
 Arab League

References

External links
 FANA English
 FANA Arabic
 UIA FANA

News agencies
Arab mass media
Arab news agencies
News agencies based in Lebanon
Organizations established in 1975